Alexander "Alex" Ken Hermansson, (born 22 January 1992) is a Swedish YouTube and television presenter. Hermansson was a member of the extremesports and entertainment group Rackartygarna.

During the summer of 2014 he was the presenter of the children's summer show Sommarlov along with Malin Olsson and Rijal Mbamba which was broadcast on SVT.

After that appearance he has worked as a regular presenter for shows on Barnkanalen. 
In 2014, he participated in Talang 2014 along with Rackartygarna and placed second behind Jon Henrik Fjällgren. 
During early 2015, Hermansson participated as a celebrity dancer in Let's Dance 2015 on TV4. He placed fourth.

Hermansson is also active in the Christian church Hillsong Church.

Hermansson is of Japanese descent as his father was born in Japan.

Presented shows 
2013 - Rackartygarna, TV6-Play
2014 - Juniorprogramledare på OS i Sotji, Viasat
2014 - En skev resa, Splay/YouTube
2014 - Talang Sverige [silverplats], TV3
2014 - Sommarlov, SVT Barnkanalen
2014 - Fredagkväll med Alex, SVT Barnkanalen
2015 - Alex hittar hobbyn, SVT Barnkanalen
2015 - Lets Dance, TV4

References

Living people
1992 births
Swedish YouTubers
Swedish people of Japanese descent
Swedish television personalities